Alexis Madrigal (born 1983/84) is an American journalist. He's currently the new co-host of KQED's Forum.

In 2010, Madrigal began working for The Atlantic. In 2014, he was promoted to deputy editor of TheAtlantic.com. He joined Fusion later in the year as part of a "big-name hiring spree" for the new media channel, "one of the hot-shot journalists on which Fusion is pinning its hopes." In March 2020, he started the COVID Tracking Project, a collaborative effort to track the spread of COVID-19 within the US, with Robinson Meyer and a team of volunteers. He has also written for Wired. In 2014, he spoke at the Aspen Ideas Festival alongside Tony Fadell as a member of a panel discussing "A New and Promising Energy Future". In 2017, he hosted an 8-part audio documentary on containerization called Containers. He graduated from Harvard University in 2004.

Personal life
Madrigal is married and has two children.

In October 2021, Madrigal tested positive for COVID-19 after traveling to a wedding for a friend in New Orleans. His symptoms were mild, but he continued to test positive on antigen tests for more than 10 days. His wife and children never tested positive.

Works

References

External links 
 Official site

American bloggers
American male journalists
American technology writers
1980s births
Living people
American science writers
The Atlantic (magazine) people
Harvard University alumni
21st-century American non-fiction writers
American male bloggers
Year of birth missing (living people)